Elapsoidea sundevallii, also known commonly as Sundevall's garter snake or African garter snake, is a species of venomous snake in the family Elapidae. The species is native to Southern Africa. There are five recognised subspecies.

Etymology
The specific epithet, sundevalli, honours Swedish zoologist Carl Jakob Sundevall (1801–1875).

The subspecific name, decosteri, is in honour of Belgian consul Juste De Coster, who collected natural history specimens at Delagoa Bay, Mozambique.

The subspecific name, fitzsimonsi, is in honour of South African herpetologist Vivian Frederick Maynard FitzSimons.

Geographic range
E. sundevallii is found in Botswana, Eswatini, Mozambique, Namibia, South Africa, and Zimbabwe.

Habitat

Description
Adults of E. sundevallii are slate-grey to black or dark brown on the upper body, with whitish to pinkish bellies. Juveniles are banded.

Males grow to be longer than females. The maximum recorded SVL for a female is only .

Diet
E. sundevallii preys upon frogs, lizards and their eggs, snakes, moles, and rodents.

Venom
Although E. sundevallii is venomous and can inflict a serious bite, few bites have been recorded, and none has resulted in a human fatality. Symptoms may include pain and swelling, nausea and vomiting, blurred vision, and loss of consciousness.

Reproduction
The species E. sundevallii is oviparous. A sexually mature female may lay a clutch of as many as 10 eggs.

Subspecies
The following five subspecies, including the nominotypical subspecies, are recognised as being valid.
Elapsoidea sundevallii decosteri 
Elapsoidea sundevallii fitzsimonsi 
Elapsoidea sundevallii longicauda 
Elapsoidea sundevallii media 
Elapsoidea sundevallii sundevallii 

Nota bene: A trinomial authority in parentheses indicates that the subspecies was originally described in a genus other than Elapsoidea.

References

Further reading
Boulenger GA (1888). "On new or little-known South-African Reptiles". Annals and Magazine of Natural History, Sixth Series 2: 136–141. (Elapsoidea decosteri, new species, p. 141).
Boulenger GA (1896). Catalogue of the Snakes in the British Museum (Natural History). Volume III. Containing the Colubridæ (Opisthoglyphæ and Proteroglyphæ) .... London: Trustees of the British Museum (Natural History). (Taylor and Francis, printers). xiv + 727 pp. + Plates I–XXV. (Elapechis sundevallii, new combination, pp. 360–361).
Broadley DG (1971). "A revision of the African snake genus Elapsoidea Bocage (Elapidae)". Occasional Papers of the National Museum of Southern Rhodesia 32: 577–626. (Elapsoidea sundevallii longicauda, new subspecies; Elapsoidea sundevallii media, new subspecies).
Loveridge A (1944). "Further revisions of African Snake Genera". Bulletin of the Museum of Comparative Zoölogy at Harvard College 95 (2): 121–247.  (Elapsoidea sundevalli fitzsimonsi, new subspecies, pp. 229–231). 
Smith A (1848). Illustrations of the Zoology of South Africa; Consisting Chiefly of Descriptions and Figures of the Objects of Natural History Collected during an Expedition into the Interior of South Africa, in the Years 1834, 1835, and 1836; Fitted out by "The Cape of Good Hope Association for the Exploring Central Africa:" Together with a Summary of African Zoology, and an Inquiry into the Geographical Ranges of Species in that Quarter of the Globe. [Volume III. Reptilia.] London: Lords Commissioners of Her Majesty's Treasury. (Smith, Elder and Co., printers). Plates + unnumbered pages of text. (Elaps sunderwallii, new species, Plate 56). (in English and Latin).

 
sundevallii
Snakes of Africa
Reptiles of Botswana
Reptiles of Eswatini
Reptiles of Mozambique
Reptiles of Namibia
Reptiles of South Africa
Reptiles of Zimbabwe
Taxa named by Andrew Smith (zoologist)
Reptiles described in 1848